Tanya is a low-budget 1976 comedy film directed by Nate Rodgers and loosely based on the experiences of Patricia Hearst. The lead character, Charlotte Kane, is 20-year-old heiress of a newspaper mogul. She is kidnapped by five sex-crazed pseudo-revolutionaries who call themselves "The Symphonic Liberation Army" (a parody of the Symbionese Liberation Army).  Charlotte is quickly converted to their cause and changes her name to Tanya.

External links
 

American comedy-drama films
1976 films
American sexploitation films
Films about kidnapping
Films about terrorism in the United States
Comedy films based on actual events
1976 comedy-drama films
Cultural depictions of Patty Hearst
Films à clef
1970s English-language films
1970s American films